Oatlands Palace  is a former Tudor and Stuart royal palace which took the place of the former manor of the village of Oatlands near Weybridge, Surrey. Little remains of the original building, so excavations of the palace took place in 1964 to rediscover its extent.

Palace
Much of the foundation stone for the palace came from Chertsey Abbey which fell into ruins after the Dissolution of the Monasteries.

Henry VIII came to Oatlands on a progress in September 1514 and hunted stags on Chertsey Meads. He acquired the house in 1538, and rebuilt it for Anne of Cleves. The palace was built around three main adjoining quadrangular courtyards covering fourteen hectares and utilising an existing 15th-century moated manor house. A bed made for Anne of Cleves was described in an inventory of Oatlands. "Quene Annes bedd" had curtains of crimson cloth of gold and cloth of silver decorated with borders of purple velvet on the seams. It featured 108 embroidered badges of Anne and Henry and their crowned arms on the tester and ceeler.

Henry VIII married Catherine Howard in the palace on 28 July 1540. Henry's subsequent wife, Catherine Parr, spent time at the Palace as well. Records of her writings include a letter sent from Oatlands to her brother, William, Lord Parr, shortly after her marriage to the King in July 1543.

It subsequently became the residence, at various times, of Mary I, Elizabeth I, James I and Charles I. 
It was to Oatlands that Mary Tudor retreated after her supposed pregnancy. Her previous residence, Hampton Court Palace, had housed the nursery staff that was assembled for the birth of the child. The announcement of a movement to Oatlands (considerably smaller than Hampton) ended any hope of a happy outcome of the Queen's pregnancy.

Elizabeth I employed her Sergeant Painter Leonard Fryer to decorate the long gallery with a woodgrain pattern in 1598. He primed the panelling with white lead paint and then painted imitation "flotherwoode", with gold and silver highlights on the mouldings, with arabesque patterns and paintwork of "markatree", perhaps resembling marquetry. Fryer used "sweet varnish" to finish his work, chosen for its scent.

Anne of Denmark

Prince Henry and Princess Elizabeth were in residence in August 1603. Prince Charles came from Dunfermline Palace to Oatlands in September 1604. James I stayed in 1605 and enjoyed fishing in the Thames. The palace was in some disrepair, with rainwater leaking into the royal apartments. His ushers nailed up the doors to rooms above the king's lodging to prevent noise disturbing him.

James I's wife Anne of Denmark built a silkworm house and a vineyard, and employed Inigo Jones to design an ornamental gateway from the Privy Garden to the Park. The gardener John Bonnall planted "new and rare fruits, flowers, herbs, and trees". Her collection at Oatlands included portraits of her Danish nephews, her courtiers Jean Drummond, Mary Middlemore, Tom Durie, and her own portrait by Paul van Somer with her horse, hunting dogs, and African servant, showing the new gateway and the palace in a background.

The ambassador of Savoy Antonio Scanese, Count of Scarnafes came to see Anne of Denmark at Oatlands on 3 October 1614. She provided a grand reception for the Venetian ambassador Piero Contarini at Oatlands on 30 August 1618. He was welcomed and entertained by her Lord Chamberlain, the Earl of Leicester, while they waited for the arrival of several noblewomen, including Margaret Howard, Countess of Nottingham and the Countess of Arundel. The Queen had planned a hunt, but it was rained off. At the end of the dinner there were sweetmeats, then they stood and toasted Elizabeth, Electress Palatine and Frederick V. Furnishing were borrowed from other palaces for such occasions by the under-keeper Ralph Dison.

Henrietta Maria
Oatlands was one of the properties settled upon Henrietta Maria on her marriage to Charles I and she used it as a country retreat, installing part of her art collection on site, and employing John Tradescant the elder for its gardens. In August 1637 it was rumoured she was sickening with consumption, and at Oatlands drinking asses milk as a remedy.

In 1646 Oatlands was a temporary home of the infant Princess Henrietta of England, daughter of Charles I of England and later Duchess of Orleans, sister-in-law of Louis XIV. Her governess Lady Dalkeith smuggled her into France in the summer of 1646. After the King's execution some Royal residences were sold by the Commonwealth Government to help pay Parliamentary debts. Oatlands Palace and its contents were purchased for about £4,000 by Robert Turbridge. He demolished it and sold the bricks to Sir Richard Weston of Sutton Place. A single house – remote from the site of the palace itself – may have originally functioned as a hunting lodge.

House
After the Restoration, during the 1660s, the house was the residence of William Boteler who had supported the Commonwealth and served as one of the ten major-generals during the Rule of the Major-Generals (1656), during which time he was noted as being harsh on Roman Catholics, Quakers and Cavaliers.

The house was later occupied and extended by Sir Edward Herbert, the Lord Chief Justice, but was forfeited to the Crown when he followed James II into exile. It was then awarded to his brother, Arthur Herbert, 1st Earl of Torrington, who was later the admiral in command of the English and Dutch Fleets at the Battle of Beachy Head.

The house was again enlarged by the Duke of Newcastle, Henry Clinton, who laid out formal gardens.

In 1790, Oatlands was leased from the Crown by the Prince Frederick, Duke of York and Albany the second son of George III, and the subject of the nursery rhyme The Grand Old Duke of York. His architect was Henry Holland.

In his second London notebook, composer Joseph Haydn recorded a two-day visit in November 1791:

He was the guest of the Prince of Wales and the Duke of York, playing music for four hours each evening.

Mansion and hotel

In 1794 the mansion was burnt down and was quickly rebuilt in the Gothic style of the period. After the death of the Duchess of York in 1820, the whole property was sold. It was bought by Edward Hughes Ball Hughes in 1824 (although it was not until after the Duke's death in 1827 that the sale was finally concluded) and again remodelled in 1830. Hughes had tried to dispose of the estate by public auction in 1829 but this part did not sell. He let the mansion and adjoining parkland to Lord Francis Egerton for a seven-year period in 1832 and renewed for a similar period in 1839. The arrival of the London and South Western Railway in 1838 made the area ripe for daily commuting to London. In 1846 the estate was broken up into lots for building development and sold at three public auctions in May, August and September of that year. Following a period of private ownership by James Watts Peppercorne, the house became a hotel in 1856, known as the South Western (later Oatlands Park) Hotel.

From 1916 to 1918, during World War I, the hotel was used as a hospital for New Zealand troops injured in France. Subsequently, one of the main streets in Walton-on-Thames was renamed New Zealand Avenue in honour of those men.

The four-star Oatlands Park Hotel now occupies the site where the Oatlands mansion (Oatlands House) once stood, and there are still some signs of the earlier stages in its existence visible within the core of the building. It is not on the site of Oatlands Palace, down the hill towards the centre of Weybridge, once the same estate in land.

References

External links

Oatlands Park Hotel
Oatlands Heritage
Letter of Catherine Parr to brother William, July 1543

1538 establishments in England
Houses completed in 1538
Borough of Elmbridge
Country houses in Surrey
Tudor royal palaces in England
Palaces in England
Royal residences in England
Former palaces in England
Demolished buildings and structures in England
Henrietta Maria
Henry VIII
Anne of Cleves
Anne of Denmark